Alf Key (14 November 1897 – 29 November 1977) was an Australian rules footballer who played for the Carlton Football Club and Fitzroy Football Club in the Victorian Football League (VFL).

Notes

External links 
		
Alf Key's profile at Blueseum

1897 births
1977 deaths
Australian rules footballers from Victoria (Australia)
Carlton Football Club players
Fitzroy Football Club players